Cincius, whose praenomen was likely Lucius and whose cognomen goes unrecorded, was an antiquarian writer probably during the time of Augustus. He is frequently confused with the annalist Lucius Cincius Alimentus, who fought in the Second Punic War, and some scholars still maintain that Cincius Alimentus was also the antiquarian.

None of the works of Cincius is extant, but he is cited by Livy, Festus, and others. The several works attributed to a Cincius have been assigned to one or the other of these two writers by scholars whose criteria for distinguishing them produce varying results. The authorship of the book De fastis ("On the Fasti)"), for instance, has been attributed to either one. T.P. Wiseman finds it likely that Cincius wrote "a Pausanias-like guide to the antiquities of the Capitol (if not the whole city)," including a collection of old inscriptions, and makes a jurist of him as well with a work De officio iurisconsulti.

References

Ancient Roman antiquarians
Golden Age Latin writers
Latin writers known only from secondary sources